Daniel Aase (born 22 June 1989) is a retired Norwegian footballer who played as a midfielder.

Career
He played for Start 2 between 2005 and 2007, joining Vindbjart ahead of the 2008 season. After several good seasons in the 2. divisjon, in 2015 he was loaned to Start. He then made his Tippeligaen debut in July 2015 against Viking. A permanent move followed, staying until he was shipped to FK Jerv in the summer of 2018. After 68 league and cup matches and 7 goals, he retired after the 2020 season.

Career statistics

References

1989 births
Living people
Sportspeople from Kristiansand
Norwegian footballers
Vindbjart FK players
IK Start players
FK Jerv players
Eliteserien players
Norwegian First Division players
Association football midfielders
Norwegian men's futsal players